The 1962 UCLA Bruins football team was an American football team that represented the University of California, Los Angeles (UCLA) as a member of the  Athletic Association of Western Universities (AAWU) during the 1962 NCAA University Division football season. In their fifth year under head coach William F. Barnes, the Bruins compiled an overall record of 4–6 record with a mark of 1–3 in conference play, placing fifth in AAWU.

UCLA's offensive leaders in 1962 were quarterback Larry Zeno with 458 passing yards, Kermit Alexander with 472 rushing yards, and Mel Profit with 229 receiving yards.

Schedule

References

UCLA
UCLA Bruins football seasons
UCLA Bruins football
UCLA Bruins football